This is an alphabetical list of cricketers who have played for Western Storm since their founding in 2016. They first played in the Women's Cricket Super League, a Twenty20 competition, that ran from 2016 to 2019. After a restructure of English women's domestic cricket in 2020, they now compete in the 50 over Rachael Heyhoe Flint Trophy and the Twenty20 Charlotte Edwards Cup.

Players' names are followed by the years in which they were active as a Western Storm player. Seasons given are first and last seasons; the player did not necessarily play in all the intervening seasons. Current players are shown as active to the latest season in which they played for the club. This list only includes players who appeared in at least one match for Western Storm; players who were named in the team's squad for a season but did not play a match are not included.

C
 Emma Corney (2020–2022)

D
 Naomi Dattani (2018–2019)
 Freya Davies (2016–2019)
 Jodie Dibble (2016–2017)

E
 Emily Edgcombe (2020–2021)

F
 Lauren Filer (2020–2022)

G
 Bethan Gammon (2021)
 Emily Geach (2022)
 Katie George (2020–2022)
 Danielle Gibson (2018–2022)
 Alex Griffiths (2019–2022)

H
 Nicole Harvey (2021–2022)
 Georgia Hennessy (2016–2022)
 Niamh Holland (2020–2022)
 Holly Huddleston (2017)
 Steph Hutchins (2020–2021)

K
 Heather Knight (2016–2022)

L
 Lizelle Lee (2016)
 Sophie Luff (2016–2022)

M
 Alice Macleod (2017–2018)
 Smriti Mandhana (2018–2019)
 Fi Morris (2020–2022)

N
 Claire Nicholas (2017–2022)

O
 Sonia Odedra (2019)
 Caitlin O'Keefe (2016)

P
 Lauren Parfitt (2020–2022)
 Rachel Priest (2016–2019)

R
 Mollie Robbins (2021)
 Joleigh Roberts (2021)

S
 Deepti Sharma (2019)
 Anya Shrubsole (2016–2021)
 Chloe Skelton (2021–2022)
 Sophia Smale (2022)

T
 Stafanie Taylor (2016–2018)

W
 Fran Wilson (2016–2022)
 Nat Wraith (2020–2022)

Captains

References

Western Storm